Highlands East is a township municipality located in Haliburton County, Ontario, Canada.

History
The township was incorporated in 2001 through the amalgamation of the former townships of Bancroft, Cardiff, Glamorgan, and Monmouth.

Communities

Cardiff 

Cardiff is a former mining community; Bicroft and Dyno Mines opened in 1956 and closed several years later. The chief mineral being mined in Cardiff was uranium. Cardiff is located on Highway 118 between the towns of Bancroft and Haliburton. The Cardiff Elementary School is a small school. The community also has a Royal Canadian Legion hall, a Catholic and United church, an outdoor pool, which is popular during the summer, a post office, a municipal office, a library, and a skating rink that doubles as an outdoor basketball and floor hockey court. The entrance to the townsite, off of Highway 118, is marked by a large metal sculpture of a dragonfly.

Gooderham 
Gooderham is bordered on the south end of the municipality in proximity to the Irondale River and Pine Lake to the north. It is located on a now defunct railway line, the Irondale, Bancroft and Ottawa (IB&O) Railway, part of which has been since converted into a trail network. The village of Gooderham is at the intersection of the Monck Road from the East and the Buckhorn Road from the South. The origin of the name Gooderham is not known for sure although it is likely that it was named after a member of the distillery-owning Gooderham family donated money for a local church. In any case, it was called Gooderham by the time the first post office was established in 1873. The first mills were built by 1875 using the waterfall between Gooderham Lake and the Irondale River. Logging and farming were the original attractions of the Gooderham area and Gooderham still has an active lumber mill.

Wilberforce 

Wilberforce was established as "Pusey", a station on the IB&O Railway, and named for railway president Charles J. Pusey. This little railway had initially been built to carry iron ore from open pit mines at Irondale. Although the mines had closed, the railway had high hopes of extending to Bancroft, and even higher hopes of reaching Ottawa. At Wilberforce, where the railway skirted the southern shore of Pusey Lake (now Dark Lake), the Wilberforce Lumber Company put up a sawmill. In 1909 the Wilberforce mill was leased to James Lauder and Joseph Spears, of Toronto. The IB&O Railway was taken over by the Canadian Northern Railway in 1912. Messrs. Lauder and Spears along with Lucien B. Howland, (the former General Manager of the IB&O), looking for new business opportunities, acquired a sawmill on the new CNR line north of Parry Sound, Ontario. The three men eventually established the community of Lost Channel in the Parry Sound District and went bankrupt in the process. Wilberforce is known among geocachers as the "Geocaching Capital of Canada." The first cache in the town was "Wilberforce be With You" placed by Geofellas.

Other communities 
The township also contains the smaller communities of Cheddar (ghost town), Cope Falls, Deer Lake, Dyno Estates, Essonville, Harcourt, Highland Grove, Hotspur, Ironsides, Maxwells, Pusey, South Wilberforce, Tory Hill, Upper Paudash, Ursa and Ward. Highland Grove was home to "Camp Diamond", the site of a fabled, but unfounded diamond mine. The site was used as a hockey camp for a short period of time and later became an all girls summer recreational camp.

Highlands East has 5 fire halls located throughout the municipality, with stations located in Cardiff, Highland Grove, Gooderham, Wilberforce and Paudash. The Highlands East Fire Department only has one full-time employee, its fire chief, with all of the firefighters being volunteers.

Demographics

Lakes

 Salerno Lake
 Paudash Lake
 Gooderham Lake previously Pine Lake
 Billings Lake previously Wolf Lake
 Lake Wilbermere (also known as South Wilberforce Lake)
 Glamour Lake previously Bear Lake or Big Bear Lake
 Stormy Lake
Eels Lake

See also
Uranium mining in the Bancroft area
List of townships in Ontario

References

External links

Lower-tier municipalities in Ontario
Municipalities in Haliburton County